Doi Pui, is a mountain ("doi") west of Chiang Mai, Thailand.

History
In 1957, the original evergreen forest was replaced with Cupressus torulosa and Pinus kesiya trees.

Access
From the south, there are trails going up to the summit from a campground. From the east, trails lead to the summit from the Hmong village of Khun Chang Khian.

References

Thanon Thong Chai Range
Geography of Chiang Mai province
Mountains of Thailand